Knud Knudsen (3 January 1832 – 21 May 1915) was one of Norway's first professional photographers and a pioneer within Norwegian photography. His work includes images from most of Norway in his time and documents much of Norwegian history and ethnology in his photography career 1862–1900.

Knudsen was born in Odda, the son of a merchant who was also a pomologist. His professional career started as a retail clerk in Bergen, and in 1862 he traveled to Reutlingen to study pomology. He returned with an enthusiasm for photography the year after and opened his photography business in Bergen 1864.

Knud Knudsen left a collection of 13.500 wet and dry plate negatives, and about 20.000 of albumin silver prints. The negative and print collection are at The Picture Collection, University of Bergen Library.

Bibliography
Walker Art Center, Friedman, Martin: The Frozen Image. Scandinavian photography. 1982
Naomi Rosenblum: A World History of Photography. 1984
Å.Digranes, S.Greve og O.Reiakvam:Det norske bildet. Knud Knudsens fotografier 1864–1900 1988
N.Morgenstern: Fotograf Knud Knudsen. Bilder fra en nylig oppdaget samling. 1989
O.Reiakvam, Bilderøyndom, røyndomsbilde: fotografi som kulturelle tidsuttrykk 1997
Heimatmuseum Reutlingen: Reise nach Reutlingen 1862. Stereoskopbilder des nerwegischen fotograafen Knud Knudsen. 1997
Roger Erlandsen: Pas nu paa!: Nu tar jeg fra Huldet!  Om fotografiets første hundre år i Norge - 1839-1940 2000
Larsen, Peter og Lien, Sigrid: Norsk Fotohistorie. Fra daguerrotypi til digitalisering. 2007
Ekeberg, Jonas og Østgaard Lund, Harald (red): 80 millioner bilder. Norsk Kulturhistorisk fotografi 1855–2005. 2008

External links

Knud Knudsen a Norwegian photographer pioneer
The Picture Collection, University of Bergen Library
http://www.galleribalder.com/portfolio38339p2.html

19th-century Norwegian photographers
1832 births
1915 deaths
People from Odda